Uzbek Americans are Americans of Uzbek descent. The community also includes those who have dual American and Uzbek citizenship.

History 
Since the late 1950s, over 1,000 Uzbek families have migrated to the United States, and primarily to the New York metropolitan area. The first of them came from Eastern Europe, but from the mid-1960s they mainly came from Turkey and, to a lesser extent, Turkmenistan, Saudi Arabia, and elsewhere.

According to U.S. Department of State Bureau of Consular Affairs Statistics, 56,028 families won visas through the DV lottery program between 1996–2016.

A wave of Uzbek immigrants to the United States settled in the country in the 1980s, because of the Soviet invasion of Afghanistan. From the early 1990s to the present day, most of the Uzbeks who migrate go to the U.S.

Demography 

Every year, around 6,000–7,800 Uzbeks immigrate to the United States. More than 20,000 ethnic Uzbeks are citizens of the United States today. The greater percentages of Uzbeks live mainly in New York, Philadelphia and New Jersey, growing rapidly in populations particularly in the boroughs of Brooklyn and Queens in New York City and in Northern New Jersey. However, smaller pockets of Uzbek Americans can be found in other major American metropolitan areas, such as San Antonio, Houston, Chicago, Cleveland, and Pittsburgh. 2012 and 2013 had the largest migration of Uzbeks to the United States in history, much more so than the 1,000–1,800 green card lottery winners that were originally set in place. The neighborhood of Forest Hills, Queens has the largest number of Bukharan Jews in the United States.

Other Uzbek populations are most centered in Texas. San Antonio and Houston have the largest Uzbek populations in Texas.
Most Uzbek migrants are engaged in business and science, working in various institutions and companies. Part of the Uzbek diaspora is involved in government offices, schools and colleges of the country, as well as in areas like defense, aviation and medicine. Some representatives of the Uzbek diaspora hold senior executive positions in a number of American states.

Organizations 
As with other ethnic groups in the United States, Uzbek Americans also have several cultural associations. The Central Asian Foundation, established in July 2015, is a non-profit organization that promotes the social welfare of its members by developing and fostering cultural and social awareness and relations between the American and Central Asian communities in the United States.

In December 13, 1958, Uzbeks of USA formed the "Turkestan -America" Association (ATA) in Philadelphia, which joined the citizens of the former Soviet Turkestan living in United States, taking advantage the growing number of immigrants in the United States of Central Asian origin. Under federal law the U.S. first registered Association in Philadelphia and, later (in 1961), it was recorded in New York.

Notable people 

 Alexei Sultanov – classical pianist
 Jacob Arabo – jeweler, founder of Jacob & Co
 Lola Astanova – classical pianist
 Milana Vayntrub – actress and comedian
 Nazif Shahrani – professor of anthropology and Central Asian and Middle Eastern Studies at Indiana University, Bloomington
 Sylvia Nasar – journalist and writer of A Beautiful Mind
 Arthur Kaliyev – hockey player
 Lucy Dacus – singer-songwriter

See also 

 Central Asians in the United States
 Uzbekistan-United States relations
 Uzbeks

References 

 
 
Central Asian American